The original Man Yee Building, initially built in 1957, was the first building in Hong Kong with escalators.

Located between Queen's Road Central, Pottinger Street and Des Voeux Road Central in Central on the Hong Kong Island, the tower was demolished in 1999 and was rebuilt as a 35-storey (344 ft/105 m) tower with total office space of 290,000 square feet (27,000 square meters). It is owned by Man Hing Hong Property Management and Agency Company Limited and designed by architectural firm Rocco Design Architects Limited.

First generation
The original "Man Yee Building" is now referred to as the "Old Man Yee Building". Man Yee Building was built on a slope near the original Central waterfront, thus its entrance on the north and south differs by two floors.

The original Man Yee Building was the last building in Hong Kong with manually operated elevators, installed by Otis. Old-time skilled operators were hired.

Shops at the mall

References

External links

 Man Yee Building
 Man Yee Building

Skyscraper office buildings in Hong Kong
Shopping centres in Hong Kong
Central, Hong Kong